Gergely Gyurta (born 21 September 1991) is a Hungarian swimmer and national team member for his home nation.  He has competed at three Olympic Games and won World and European medals.  His older brother is Dániel Gyurta, another Olympic swimmer who specializes in the breast stroke events.

Career 
In 2010, he won his first senior international medal, winning the bronze medal in the men's 1500 m freestyle at the 2010 Short Course World Championships.

At the 2012 Summer Olympics, he competed in the Men's 1500 metre freestyle, finishing in 12th place overall in the heats.  That year, he won bronze at the European Championships.

Additionally, Gergely became the 2013 European short course champion in the 1500 metre freestyle.  In 2014, he set the Hungarian record in that event.

At the 2016 Summer Olympics, Gyurta competed in the 400 m and 1500 m freestyle events, finishing in 11th and 9th respectively.

He won the bronze medal in the 400 m medley at the 2017 European Short Course Championships.

In 2018, he set the Hungarian record in the 800 m freestyle at the Hungarian National Championships.

He finished in 15th place in the 1500 m freestyle at the 2020 Olympics.

International Swimming League 
In 2019 he was member of the 2019 International Swimming League representing Team Iron.

References

External links

1991 births
Hungarian male swimmers
Living people
Olympic swimmers of Hungary
Swimmers at the 2012 Summer Olympics
Swimmers at the 2016 Summer Olympics
Hungarian male freestyle swimmers
Swimmers from Budapest
Medalists at the FINA World Swimming Championships (25 m)
European Aquatics Championships medalists in swimming
Male medley swimmers
Universiade medalists in swimming
Universiade bronze medalists for Hungary
Medalists at the 2017 Summer Universiade
Swimmers at the 2020 Summer Olympics